The 90th Flying Training Squadron is part of the 80th Flying Training Wing based at Sheppard Air Force Base, Texas.  It operates Northrop T-38 Talon aircraft conducting flight training.

History

World War II
The 90th flew combat missions in the China Burma India Theater from 16 September 1943 – 29 April 1945.  While stationed at Moran, India, on 8 June 1944, the squadron again received Republic P-47 Thunderbolts.  It flew its first combat mission with Thunderbolts on 25 June, having transferred its Curtiss P-40 Warhawks to the depot in Karachi or to the 88th Fighter Squadron.

Pilot training
It conducted undergraduate pilot training for US and allied students from 1973 to 1981 and has been part of the Euro-NATO Joint Pilot Training Program since October 1981.

Lineage
 Constituted as the 90th Pursuit Squadron (Interceptor) on 13 January 1942
 Activated on 9 February 1942
 Redesignated 90th Fighter Squadron on 15 May 1942
 Redesignated 90th Fighter Squadron (Single Engine) on 1 July 1942
 Redesignated 90th Fighter Squadron, Single Engine on 28 February 1944
 Inactivated on 3 November 1945
 Redesignated 90th Flying Training Squadron on 25 May 1972
 Activated on 1 January 1973

Assignments
 80th Fighter Group, 9 February 1942 – 3 November 1945
 80th Flying Training Wing, 1 January1973
 80th Operations Group, 2 January 1998 – present)

Stations

 Selfridge Field, Michigan, 9 February 1942
 Newark Army Air Base, New Jersey, 24 June 1942
 LaGuardia Airport, New York, 27 August 1942
 Mitchel Field, New York, 27 February-30 April 1943
 Karachi, India, 28 June 1943
 Jorhat, India, c. 12 September 1943
 Moran, India, March 1944

 Tingkawk Sakan, Burma, 27 August 1944
 Myitkyina, Burma, 21 January 1945
 Moran, India, 5 May 1945
 Dudhkundi, India, 30 May-6 October 1945
Camp Kilmer, New Jersey, 1-3 November 1945
Sheppard Air Force Base, Texas, 1 January 1973 – present)

Aircraft
 Republic P-47 Thunderbolt (1942–1943, 1944–1945)
 Curtiss P-40 Warhawk (1943–1944)
 Northrop T-38 Talon (1973–present)

References

Notes

Bibliography

External links
80th Flying Training Wing Heritage Pamphlet
Euro-NATO Joint Jet Pilot Training (ENJJPT) Program Fact Sheet

Military units and formations in Texas
0090